Tahar Hamou (born 6 October 1959) is an Algerian fencer. He competed in the individual foil event at the 1980 Summer Olympics.

References

External links
 

1959 births
Living people
Algerian male foil fencers
Olympic fencers of Algeria
Fencers at the 1980 Summer Olympics
21st-century Algerian people